Skins is a British teen drama created by father-and-son television writers Bryan Elsley and Jamie Brittain for Company Pictures. The third series began airing on E4 on 22 January 2009 and ended on 26 March 2009. This series sees the introduction of a new cast; it follows the lives of the second generation of sixth form students Effy Stonem, Pandora Moon, Thomas Tomone, James Cook, Freddie McClair, JJ Jones, Naomi Campbell, and twin sisters Emily and Katie Fitch.

Main cast

List of episodes

References

External links

Series 03
2009 British television seasons

de:Liste der Skins-Episoden